Booth is a surname of northern English and Scottish origin, but arguably of pre 7th century Norse-Viking origins. It is or rather was, topographical, and described a person who lived in a small barn or bothy. Derived from the word "both", the word was used to denote various kinds of shelter, but especially a herdsman's dwelling on a summer pasture. The surname is most popular in Northern England, where early Scandinavian influence was marked, and to some extent in Scotland. 

One of the most-recognised persons with the surname Booth, is John Wilkes Booth, an American actor, better known for being the assassin of President Abraham Lincoln. 

At the time of the British Census of 1881, its relative frequency was highest in Cheshire (4.2 times the British average), followed by Derbyshire, Yorkshire, Lancashire, Nottinghamshire, Aberdeenshire, Lincolnshire, Staffordshire and Westmorland. In all other British counties, its relative frequency was below national average. The name Booth may refer to:

A
 Aaron Booth (born 1996), New Zealand decathlete
 Agnes Booth (1843–1910), Australian-born American actress, sister-in-law of Edwin and John Wilkes Booth
 Alan Booth (1946–1993), British travel writer
 Albert Booth (1928–2010), British politician
 Albert A. Booth (1850–1914), American pioneer and politician
 Albie Booth (1908–1959), American football player
 Alfred Allen Booth (1872–1948), British shipowner
 Andy Booth (born 1973), English retired footballer
 Andrew Donald Booth (1918–2009), British electrical engineer, physicist and computer scientist
 Annie Booth (born 1989), American jazz pianist
 Anthony Clarke Booth (1846–1899), English sergeant, recipient of the Victoria Cross
 Asia Booth Clarke (1835–1888), American poet, sister of Edwin and John Wilkes Booth

B
 Ballington Booth (1857–1940), British-born American Christian minister, co-founder of Volunteers of America and Salvation Army officer
 Barton Booth (1681–1733), British actor
 Bill Booth, American skydiving engineer and inventor
 Brad Booth (born 1976), Canadian professional poker player
 Bramwell Booth (1856–1929), 2nd General of the Salvation Army
 Brett Booth, American comic book artist
 Brian Booth (born 1933), Australian former cricketer
 Brian Booth (cricketer, born 1935), English former cricketer
 Brett Booth, born 1974, he’s the chairman of Australian dwarf society and also the last of the great lovers

C
Calvin Booth (born 1976), American National Basketball Association assistant manager and former player
Catherine Booth (1829–1890), co-founder of the Salvation Army with her husband William Booth
Catherine Bramwell-Booth (1883–1987), Salvation Army officer born Catherine Booth Booth, granddaughter of Catherine Booth
Charles Booth (social reformer) (1840–1916), English social researcher and reformer
Charles G. Booth (1896–1949), British-born American writer of detective fiction and Academy Award winner
Cherie Blair (born 1954), née Booth, wife of British Prime Minister Tony Blair
Chris Booth (born 1948), New Zealand sculptor
Christopher Booth (1924-2012), English clinician and historian
Colin Booth (mycologist) (1924–2003), English mycologist and phytopathologist
Colin Booth (born 1934), English footballer and winner of two league championship medals
Connie Booth (born 1940), American writer, actress and psychotherapist, former wife of John Cleese

D
 Dave Booth (born 1948), English football coach and former player
 David Booth (ice hockey) (born 1984), American National Hockey League player
 David G. Booth (born c. 1946), co-founder and CEO of Dimensional Fund Advisors
 Dennis Booth (born 1949), British footballer, manager and coach
 Douglas Booth (born 1992), British actor
 Douglas Allen Booth (born 1949), Anglo-American television producer, writer and cartoonist who co-wrote Scooby Doo

E
 Edwin Booth (1833–1893), American actor, brother of John Wilkes Booth
Edwin Henry Booth (1828-1899), English founder of Booths supermarkets
Edwin J. Booth (born 1955), English businessman, chair of Booths, great-great-grandson of Edwin H.
 Edwina Booth (1904–1991), American actress born Josephine Woodruff
 Emily Booth (born 1976), British actress and TV presenter
 Emma Scarr Booth (1835–1927), British-born American novelist, poet
 Emma Booth-Tucker (1860–1903), Salvation Army officer, 4th child of William and Catherine Booth
 Ernie Booth (1876–1935), New Zealand rugby union player and coach
 Eugene T. Booth (1912–2004), American nuclear physicist
 Evangeline Booth (1865–1950), 4th General of the Salvation Army, 7th child of William and Catherine Booth
 Evelyn Booth (1897–1988), Irish botanist

F
 Felix Booth (1775–1850), British gin distiller and promoter of Arctic exploration
 Franklin Booth (1874–1948), American artist and illustrator
 Frederick Booth (1890–1960), Rhodesian recipient of the Victoria Cross

G
 Gemma Booth (born 1974), English photographer
 George Booth (cartoonist) (1926–2022), American New Yorker cartoonist
 George Booth, 1st Baron Delamer (1622–1684), English peer
 George Booth, 2nd Earl of Warrington (1675–1758), English landowner and silver collector
 George Gough Booth (1864–1949), American publisher and philanthropist
 George Hoy Booth, birth name of George Formby (1904–1961), English actor, singer-songwriter and comedian
 Graham Booth (1940–2011), British politician

H
 Hartley Booth (born 1946), British former politician
Heather Booth (1945), American civil rights activist, feminist, and political strategist
 Henry Booth, 1st Earl of Warrington (1651–1694),  Member of Parliament, Privy Councillor, supporter of William of Orange in the Revolution of 1688, Mayor of Chester and author
 Henry Booth (1788–1869), British businessman, engineer and railway proponent
 Herbert Booth (1862–1926), third son of William and Catherine Booth
 Herbert Booth (trade unionist) (died 1977 or 1978), British trade unionist
 Hester Santlow (c. 1690–1773), married name Hester Booth, English dancer and actress
 Hubert Cecil Booth (1871–1955), English engineer and inventor of the vacuum cleaner

J
 James Booth (1927–2005), British actor
 James Lawler Booth, birth name of George Formby Sr (1875–1921), English actor, singer and comedian
 Jerome Booth (born 1963), British economist, author and investor
 Joe Booth (1871–1931), English footballer
 John Booth (disambiguation)
 John Wilkes Booth (1838–1865), American actor and assassin of US President Abraham Lincoln
 Joseph Booth (missionary) (1851–1932), British Baptist missionary in Africa
 Joseph Booth (rugby player) (1873–1958), Wales international rugby player
 Joseph Booth (bishop) (1886–1965), 7th Archbishop of Melbourne
 Josh Booth (born 1990), Australian rower at the 2012 Olympics
 Joshua Booth (c. 1758–1813), soldier and politician in Upper Canada
 Juini Booth (1948–2021), American jazz double-bassist
 Junius Brutus Booth (1796–1852), English stage actor, father of Edwin and John Wilkes Booth

K
 Kate Booth (1858–1955), English Salvationist and evangelist, eldest daughter of William and Catherine Booth
 Kathleen Booth (1922–2022), British pioneering computer scientist, created the first assembly language 
 Keith Booth (born 1974), American basketball coach and former player
 Kim Booth (born 1951), Australian politician
 Kristin Booth (born 1974), Canadian actress

L
 Lauren Booth (born 1967), British journalist, broadcaster and activist, half-sister of Cherie Booth
 Lawrence Booth (c. 1420–1480), Prince-Bishop of Durham, Lord Chancellor of England and Archbishop of York
 Lewis Booth (born 1948), British accountant and business executive
 Lindy Booth (born 1979), Canadian actress
 Lucy Booth (1868–1953), Salvation Army officer, 8th child of William and Catherine Booth

M
 Major Booth (1886–1916), English cricketer
 Margaret Booth (1898–2002), American film editor
 Marie Booth (1864–1937), 3rd daughter of William and Catherine Booth
 Marilyn Booth (born 1955), author, scholar and translator of Arabic literature
 Martin Booth (1944–2004), British writer and poet
 Mary Ann Booth (1843–1922), American microscopist
 Mary Louise Booth (1831–1889), American editor, translator and writer, first editor-in-chief of Harper's Bazaar
 Matthew Booth (soccer) (born 1977, South African footballer
 Maud Ballington Booth (1865–1948), Salvation Army officer and co-founder of Volunteers of America born Maud Elizabeth Charlesworth

N
 Nathaniel Booth, 4th Baron Delamer (1709–1770), English peer
 Nathaniel Booth (slave) (1826–1901), African-American escaped slave
 Newell Snow Booth (1903 - 1968), American Methodist bishop
 Newton Booth (1825–1892), American entrepreneur and politician

P
 Pat Booth (journalist) (1929–2018), New Zealand journalist
 Paul Booth (disambiguation)
 Philip Booth (disambiguation)

R
 Richard Booth (1938–2019), Welsh bookseller, pioneer of second-hand bookselling in Hay-on-Wye

S
 Samuel Booth (1775–1842), the father of William Booth
 Samuel Booth (politician) (1818–1894), English-American politician
 Samuel B. Booth (1883–1935), Episcopalian bishop
 Scott Booth (born 1971), Scottish football coach and former player
 Sean Booth, British musician; see the electronic music group Autechre
 Sherman Booth (1812–1904), Abolitionist 
 Shirley Booth (1898–1992), American actress
 Stanley Booth (born 1942), American music journalist
 Stefan Booth (born 1979), British actor
 Stephen Booth (disambiguation)

T
 Taylor Booth (mathematician) (1933–1986), American mathematician
 Taylor Booth (soccer) (born 2001), American soccer player
 Tim Booth (born 1960), British singer
 Tommy Booth (born 1949), English former footballer
 Tony Booth (actor) (1931-2017), British actor
 Tony Booth (musician) (born 1943), American country music singer

W
 Walter Booth (1791–1870), American politician
 Walter C. Booth (1874–1944), American college football head coach
 Walter R. Booth (1869–1938), British magician and film pioneer
 Wayne C. Booth (1921–2005), American literary critic
 William Booth (disambiguation)

See also
 Justice Booth (disambiguation)
 Booth (disambiguation)
 Boothe, a surname
 Baron Basing, the barons' family name being Sclater-Booth
 Gore-Booth

References

English-language surnames